Eschweilera integrifolia is a species of woody plant in the family Lecythidaceae. It is found in Colombia, Ecuador, and Panama.

References

integrifolia
Flora of Colombia
Flora of Ecuador
Flora of Panama
Least concern plants
Taxonomy articles created by Polbot